HMS Chester was a 50-gun fourth rate ship of the line of the Royal Navy, launched 21 March 1691 at Woolwich Dockyard.

She was captured by the French at the Battle at The Lizard on 21 October 1707.

See also
List of ships captured in the 18th century

Notes

References

Lavery, Brian (2003) The Ship of the Line - Volume 1: The development of the battlefleet 1650-1850. Conway Maritime Press. .

Ships of the line of the Royal Navy
1690s ships
Captured ships